Nguyễn Thanh Nhân (born 25 October 2000) is a Vietnamese professional footballer who plays as a left-back for V.League 1 club Hoàng Anh Gia Lai and the Vietnam national team.

Club career
A graduate from Hoang Anh Gia Lai – Arsenal JMG Academy, Thanh Nhân was promoted to the first team in 2022 to become Nguyễn Phong Hồng Duy's back-up at the left-back position. He made his first league debut on 7 February 2022 in the 1–1 draw Topenland Bình Định. On 28 April 2022, Thanh Nhân had his first AFC Champions League appearance in the 0–2 defeat against Japanese side Yokohama F. Marinos, replacing Nguyễn Công Phượng in the 54th minute.

International career
In February 2022, due to numerous COVID-19 cases within the Vietnam U23 squad, Thanh Nhân and 9 other players were additionally called up to the team for the 2022 AFF U-23 Championship in Cambodia. Thanh Nhân played two matches in total during the tournament, including the 1–0 against Thailand in group stage and the semi-final victory against Timor Leste, in which he scored the winning penalty to help U23 Vietnam won 5–3 in the penalty shoot-out. His teammates secured the title by defeating Thailand 1-0 again in the final.

In June 2022, Gong Oh-kyun named Thanh Nhân in the Vietnam U23's squad for the 2022 AFC U-23 Asian Cup in Uzbekistan. Thanh Nhân played in the 3 matches during the tournament and had an assist in the group stage match against Malaysia with a cross to help Nhâm Mạnh Dũng headed the opener.

Thanh Nhân made his senior level debut on 25 September 2022 against Singapore in the 2022 VFF Tri-Nations Series. He substituted Phan Tuấn Tài in the 46th minute and scored his first international goal just 5 minutes after. The match ended in a 4–0 win for Vietnam.

Career statistics

Club

Notes

International

International goals

Honours
Vietnam U23
AFF U-23 Championship: 2022
Vietnam
VFF Cup: 2022

References 

2000 births
Living people
Vietnamese footballers
Association football fullbacks
V.League 1 players
Hoang Anh Gia Lai FC players
People from An Giang Province
Vietnam international footballers